Linas Mėgelaitis (born 9 September 1998) is a Lithuanian footballer who plays as a midfielder for Italian  club Viterbese.

Club career
Mėgelaitis begun his career with FK Panevėžys team, moving to FK Šiauliai, and FC Stumbras in quick succession. Mėgelaitis joined Latina after a short spell with  Pro Vercelli. Mėgelaitis made his professional debut for Latina in a Serie B 2–1 loss to Avellino on 18 May 2017.

On 2 September 2019 he returned to Sicula Leonzio on a permanent basis following the loan in the previous season.

On 8 January 2020 he signed with another Serie C club Gubbio until the end of the 2019–20 season.

On 29 July 2021 he signed a three-year contract with Viterbese.

International career
He made his debut for Lithuania national football team on 11 November 2020 in a friendly game against Faroe Islands.

Scores and results list Lithuania's goal tally first.

References

External links
 
 
 
 Mėgelaitis Sky Sports Profile
 Mėgelaitis Serie A Profile

1998 births
Living people
Sportspeople from Panevėžys
Lithuanian footballers
Association football midfielders
Serie B players
Serie C players
Latina Calcio 1932 players
U.S. Lecce players
A.S.D. Sicula Leonzio players
A.S. Gubbio 1910 players
U.S. Viterbese 1908 players
Lithuanian expatriate footballers
Lithuanian expatriate sportspeople in Italy
Expatriate footballers in Italy
Lithuania youth international footballers
Lithuania under-21 international footballers
Lithuania international footballers